The World Wants To Be Deceived (German: Die Welt will belogen sein) is a 1926 German silent film directed by Peter Paul Felner and starring Harry Liedtke,  Georg Alexander and Mady Christians.

The film's art direction was by Ernst Stern.

Cast
 Harry Liedtke as Robert Cors, Direktor einer Waffenfabrik  
 Georg Alexander as Charles Barcknell  
 Mady Christians as Mery, seine Frau  
 Walter Rilla as Dr. Stone, Arzt  
 Paul Biensfeldt as Hutten  
 Mary Nolan as Ly, dessen Tochter  
 Henri De Vries as Albert Cors  
 Eugen Rex as Jones, Journalist  
 Paul Morgan as Ein Professor  
 Carl Geppert as Dr. Sixtus  
 Else Reval

References

Bibliography
 Hans-Michael Bock and Tim Bergfelder. The Concise Cinegraph: An Encyclopedia of German Cinema. Berghahn Books.

External links

1926 films
Films of the Weimar Republic
German silent feature films
Films directed by Peter Paul Felner
German black-and-white films
Nero-Film films
Bavaria Film films